Betsy Barbour House (Barbour) is a residence hall operated by University of Michigan Housing at the University of Michigan in Ann Arbor.

Hall Profile 

Barbour houses approximately 120 occupants, 70% of which are freshmen. The residence is one of three all-female residence halls on campus. 
The hall contains a laundry room, two lounges, front desk, and multiple kitchenettes. It shares resources with its next-door sister hall Helen Newberry House, which contains the exercise/dance room, kitchen, and computing site.

Location 
Located just across the street from Angell Hall, Barbour is one of the closest residence halls to UM's central campus. The street address is  420 South State Street.

History 
Betsy Barbour Dormitory was Designed by World Renown architect Albert Kahn in 1917. The main entry was altered in 1930 and a passageway connecting Betsy Barbour to Helen Newberry was designed in 1933. (Albert Kahn Project number 829_Albert Kahn Associates project list
) Barbour was built in 1920, as a gift from Levi Barbour, a former UM Regent. One of his sponsored students from Japan, Kikuchi Matsu, had died of tuberculosis as a result of inadequate living conditions at UM, and this prompted his decision to help construct new housing. Albert Kahn Project number 829_Albert Kahn Associates project list updated 2020_03_12)

References

University of Michigan campus
University and college dormitories in the United States
1920 establishments in Michigan
History of women in Michigan